The 1985 Women's European Volleyball Championship was the fourteenth edition of the event, organised by Europe's governing volleyball body, the Confédération Européenne de Volleyball. It was hosted in several cities in the Netherlands from 29 September to 6 October 1985, with the final round held in Arnhem.

Participating teams

Format
The tournament was played in two different stages. In the first stage, the twelve participants were divided into three groups of four teams each. In the second stage, two groups were formed, one containing the winners and runners-up from all first stage groups (six teams in total) to contest the tournament title. A second group was formed by the remaining six teams which played for position places (7th to 12th). All groups in both stages played a single round-robin format.

Pools composition

Squads

Venues

Preliminary round

Pool 1
venue location: Beverwijk, Netherlands

|}

|}

Pool 2
venue location: Enschede, Netherlands

|}

|}

Pool 3
venue location: Leeuwarden, Netherlands

|}

|}

Final round

7th–12th pool
venue location: Sittard, Netherlands

|}

|}

Final pool
venue location: Arnhem, Netherlands

|}

|}

Final ranking

References
 Confédération Européenne de Volleyball (CEV)

External links
 Results at todor66.com

European Volleyball Championships
Volleyball Championship
V
Women's European Volleyball Championships
Women's European Volleyball Championship
Women's European Volleyball Championship
Women's volleyball in the Netherlands
Sports competitions in Arnhem